This list contains the names of albums that contain a hidden track and also information on how to find them. Not all printings of an album contain the same track arrangements, so some copies of a particular album may not have the hidden track(s) listed below. Some of these tracks may be hidden in the pregap, and some hidden simply as a track following the listed tracks. The list is ordered by artist name using the surname where appropriate.

 Jack Off Jill:
 Sexless Demons and Scars: "Angels Fuck and Devils Kiss" is Track 99.
 Clear Hearts, Grey Flowers: A cover of "Lovesong" by The Cure is Track 66 the end of the album, following many 4-second empty tracks.
 Janet Jackson:
 janet.: "Whoops Now" at the end of "Sweet Dreams," the outro of the album
 The Velvet Rope: "Can't Be Stopped" at the end of the last track "Special" or "God's Stepchild" in the Japanese bonus track version
 Michael Jackson:
 Dangerous: "Intro" is at the start of track 8, "Black or White," and has separate credits in the booklet than "Black or White."
 Mick Jagger:
 Goddess in the Doorway: An unlisted track of lounge music is heard after the final song, "Brand New Set of Rules," concludes.
 The Jam:
 All Mod Cons: "English Rose" was left off the back cover and label of the original version and its lyrics were not featured in the original version's booklet, because Paul Weller believed the lyrics and song title to be personal. They have been added to re-issues and re-releases.
 Fire and Skill: The Songs of the Jam: "No One in the World," a hidden track by Paul Weller after Noel Gallagher's "To Be Someone."
 Jamiroquai:
 Travelling Without Moving: "Funktion" and/or "Do You Know Where You're Coming From" at the end of the album. Which song is hidden differs by country. The UK version contains "Funktion" on a separate track. On the album's official YouTube upload by Sony Music UK, a link displayed as a somewhat camouflaged rectangle on the track listing in the video itself takes the user to a separate YouTube upload of "Funktion".
 Synkronized: "Deeper Underground" is a hidden track in all the releases of the album, except in Japan and Australia, where it is listed as a track on CD2.
 A Funk Odyssey: "So Good to Feel Real" at the end of "Picture of my Life" (Exceptions are the Australian and the Japanese special editions of the album)
 Jars of Clay, Jars of Clay: "Four Seven," a brief jam-oriented song following a few minutes of silence on the last track ("Blind"). Its lyrics are the Scriptural verse 2 Corinthians 4:7, where the band gets its name from. As the tracks fades, the listener gets over 20 minutes of incidental sound from the recording of the string section part from "Blind."
 Jarvis Cocker: 'Running the World' on the end of 'Quantum Theory'.
 Jawbox: Jawbox, their final album, includes a final, hidden track; a cover of the Tori Amos song "Cornflake Girl."
 Jay-Z:
 The Blueprint : After some noise, there are tracks "Breathe Easy" and a remix of "Girls, Girls, Girls".
 Vol. 3... Life and Times of S. Carter: After a minute of silence, "Jigga My Nigga" and "Girl's Best Friend" appeared on the outro as hidden tracks.
 Jedi Mind Tricks:
 Legacy of Blood: Following "Before the Great Collapse" the hidden track "The President's Wife" featuring Des Devious plays, in an edited format.
 Visions of Gandhi: After the final track "Raw is War 2003" there are 3 bonus tracks; "I Against I (Remix)" featuring Planetary and Crypt the Warchild, "Animal Rap (Micky Ward Mix)" featuring Kool G Rap, and "The Army" featuring King Syze and Esoteric.
 Jefferson Airplane: Surrealistic Pillow remastered version has hidden track after the bonus mono version of White Rabbit (final track on CD)
 Jesus Jones, Culture Vulture ! has tracks at 5-11 unmentioned on the sleeve, all a "broken down" version of the first song which when put together form the first song. They allow fans to remix the song.
 Jethro Tull, Dot Com: After a minute of silence of track 14, there is "The Secret Language of Birds," which starts with an Ian Anderson introduction.
 Jewel, Spirit: "This Little Bird" (a cappella) follows "Absence of Fear," the final listed track.
 Jimmy Buffett:
 Banana Wind: "Treetop Flyer" after "False Echos"
 Billy Joel:
 The Stranger: A reprise of "The Stranger" follows the final track, "Everybody Has a Dream".
 My Lives: Track 13 on disc 4 contains an interview featuring Joel promoting his album Glass Houses.
 Freedy Johnston: The Trouble Tree: Hidden songs "The Trouble Tree" and a remix of "Little Red Haired Girl" at the end of the album
 Jorge Ben Jor: 23: contains a funny vocal track after the last track.
 Journey:
 Trial By Fire: Contains an unlisted 15th track, "Baby I'm A-Leavin' You." That track can also be found on Disc Two of the band's 2001 compilation, The Essential Journey.
 Greatest Hits Live: After the final song, "Wheel In The Sky", an unlisted 17th track contains 40 seconds of fireworks and crowd noise. 
 Jovanotti's Buon Sangue Title track is hidden at the end of the album
 Jim Bailey the stonking xmas mix: rewind from track 1.
 The Juliana Theory, Deadbeat Sweetheartbeat (2006): After the final listed song "French Kiss Off," a soft hidden track named "Her Velvet Voice" can be heard, starting at about 4:40 and lasting for about 10 minutes. The lyrics for this song were put into the CD jacket under its own division as a separate song.
 Junkie XL, Saturday Teenage Kick (1997): "Mulu" appears after the final track "Future In Computer Hell" at 8:03.
 Justice, Audio, Video, Disco (2011): At 6:00 of song, "Audio, Video, Disco", a hidden track called "Presence" starts playing and lasts about 4:37. The track was later released as a b-side to the single 'Helix'.

See also
 List of backmasked messages
 List of albums with tracks hidden in the pregap

References 

J